The Journal of Policy History is a quarterly peer-reviewed academic journal of public policy.

Overview
The journal is published by Cambridge University Press, in collaboration with the School of Historical, Philosophical, and Religious Studies at Arizona State University and the Political History Institute. Its editors-in-chief are Donald T. Critchlow (Arizona State University) and James Strickland (Arizona State University).

References

External links
 

Quarterly journals
Public policy
English-language journals
Political science journals
Cambridge University Press academic journals
Arizona State University publications